Gabriel Kelly is a former Gaelic footballer who played for the Cavan county team.

Playing career
Renowned as one of the great corner-backs of his era, Kelly was the first Cavan man to receive an Cú Chulainn Award and featured regularly on All-Star teams selected in the 1960s ('63, '64, '67). He was a permanent fixture on the all-conquering Ulster Railway Cup teams of the 1960s (1964, ‘ 65, ’66 and ’68). He won Ulster Senior Football Championship medals in 1962, '64, '67 and '69. He went on to manage Cavan in the early '80's.

Other honours
 He won a Connacht Minor Football Championship with the Mayo county team
 Number 122 in The 125 greatest stars of the GAA

References

Year of birth missing (living people)
Living people
Cavan Gaels Gaelic footballers
Cavan inter-county Gaelic footballers
Gaelic football backs
Sportspeople from County Mayo